The Eurybiini are a small tribe of metalmark butterflies (family Riodinidae). They are one of the basal tribes of the Riodininae, outside the main radiation but not quite as primitive as the Mesosemiini. Though numerous Riodinidae genera have not yet been unequivocally placed in a tribe and the genus list is thus preliminary, it is not very likely that many other genera will end up being assigned here.

Genera
 Alesa Doubleday, 1847
 Eurybia [Illiger], 1807

Footnotes

References
  (2007): Tree of Life Web Project - Eurybiini Stichel 1910. Version of 2007-MAY-05. Retrieved 2008-JUL-07.
  (2007): Butterflies of Southern Amazonia. Neotropical Butterflies, Mission, Texas. 
  (2008): Markku Savela's Lepidoptera and some other life forms: Riodinidae. Version of 2008-FEB-23. Retrieved 2008-JUL-07.

Riodininae
Riodinidae of South America
Taxa named by Enzio Reuter
Butterfly tribes